Borgaon is a village in the Tasgaon taluka of Sangli district in Maharashtra state, India.

Demographics
Covering  and comprising 350 households at the time of the 2011 census of India, Borgaon had a population of 5094. There were 2552 males and 2542 females.

References

Villages in Sangli district